Helichrysum cameroonense is a species of flowering plant in the family Asteraceae. It is found only in Cameroon. Its natural habitat is subtropical or tropical dry lowland grassland.

References

cameroonense
Flora of Cameroon
Near threatened plants
Taxonomy articles created by Polbot